The 1984 UCLA Bruins softball team represented the University of California, Los Angeles in the 1984 NCAA Division I softball season.  The Bruins were coached by Sharron Backus, who led her tenth season.  The Bruins played their home games at Sunset Field and finished with a record of 45–6–1.  They competed in the Western Collegiate Athletic Association, where they finished first with a 7–3 record.

The Bruins were invited to the 1984 NCAA Division I softball tournament, where they swept the West Regional and then completed a run through the Women's College World Series to claim their second NCAA Women's College World Series Championship.  The Bruins had earlier claimed an AIAW title in 1978 and the first NCAA event in 1982.

Personnel

Roster

Coaches

Schedule

References

UCLA
UCLA Bruins softball seasons
1984 in sports in California
Women's College World Series seasons
NCAA Division I softball tournament seasons